Dumraon Tola is a small village near Jagdishpur (Bhojpur) Bihar, India.

References

Villages in Bhojpur district, India